Cheyenne Rova (born 23 April 1995) is a Fijian swimmer. She competed in the women's 100 metre backstroke event at the 2017 World Aquatics Championships.

She won silver with her team at the 2011 Pacific Games in the 4×100 metres freestyle and 4×100 metres medley relay events, as well as the 4×100 metres and the 4×200 metres freestyle relay at the 2015 Pacific Games. She also competed in three events at the 2018 Commonwealth Games.

She is a sister of Adele Rova.

See also
 List of Fijian records in swimming

References

External links
 

1995 births
Living people
People from Levuka
Fijian female swimmers
Commonwealth Games competitors for Fiji
Swimmers at the 2014 Commonwealth Games
Swimmers at the 2018 Commonwealth Games
Swimmers at the 2022 Commonwealth Games
Swimmers at the 2020 Summer Olympics
Olympic swimmers of Fiji

Minnesota State University, Mankato alumni